Onicha-Ado is the small, original village that was later incorporated and formed the city of Onitsha, on the east bank of the river Niger in eastern Nigeria, in the area currently called the Anambra state of Nigeria.

References

Communities on the Niger River
Igbo subgroups